The NCEP/NCAR Reanalysis is an atmospheric reanalysis produced by the National Centers for Environmental Prediction (NCEP) and the National Center for Atmospheric Research (NCAR). It is a continually updated globally gridded data set that represents the state of the Earth's atmosphere, incorporating observations and numerical weather prediction (NWP) model output from 1948 to present.

Accessing the data 
The data is available for free download from the NOAA Earth System Research Laboratory and NCEP.  It is distributed in Netcdf and GRIB files, for which a number of tools and libraries exist.
It is available for download through the NCAR CISL Research Data Archive on the NCEP/NCAR Reanalysis main data page.

Uses 
 Initializing a smaller scale atmospheric model
 Climate assessment

Subsequent updates 
Since then NCEP-DOE Reanalysis 2 and the NCEP CFS Reanalysis are released. The former focuses in fixing existing bugs with the NCEP/NCAR Reanalysis system – most notably surface energy and usage of observed precipitation forcing to the land surface, but otherwise uses a similar numerical model and data assimilation system. The latter is based on the NCEP Climate Forecast System.

See also 
ECMWF re-analysis

References

Further reading 
 Kistler, R., E. Kalnay, W. Collins, S. Saha, G. White, J. Woollen, M. Chelliah, W. Ebisuzaki, M. Kanamitsu, V. Kousky, H. van den Dool, R. Jenne, and M. Fiorino, 2001: The NCEP-NCAR 50-Year Reanalysis: Monthly Means CD-ROM and Documentation. Bull. Amer. Meteor. Soc., 82, 247–268.
 Kalnay, E., M. Kanamitsu, R. Kistler, W. Collins, D. Deaven, L. Gandin, M. Iredell, S. Saha, G. White, J. Woollen, Y. Zhu, M. Chelliah, W. Ebisuzaki, W. Higgins, J. Janowiak, K. C. Mo, C. Ropelewski, J. Wang, A. Leetmaa, R. Reynolds, R. Jenne, and D. Joseph, 1996: The NCEP/NCAR 40-Year Reanalysis Project". Bull. Amer. Meteor. Soc., 77, 437–471.

External links 
Reanalyses.org website
Climate Data Guide

Numerical climate and weather models
Meteorological data and networks
National Weather Service numerical models